The yellow-throated longclaw (Macronyx croceus) is a species of bird in the family Motacillidae. It is found in Angola, Benin, Burkina Faso, Burundi, Cameroon, Central African Republic, Chad, Republic of the Congo, Democratic Republic of the Congo, Eswatini, Ivory Coast, Gabon, Gambia, Ghana, Guinea, Guinea-Bissau, Kenya, Lesotho, Liberia, Malawi, Mali, Mozambique, Niger, Nigeria, Rwanda, Senegal, Sierra Leone, Somalia, South Africa, South Sudan, Tanzania, Togo, Uganda, Zambia, and Zimbabwe. Its natural habitats are dry savanna, subtropical or tropical seasonally wet or flooded lowland grassland, and sandy shores.

Gallery

References

External links
 Yellowthroated Longclaw - Species text in The Atlas of Southern African Birds.

yellow-throated longclaw
Birds of Sub-Saharan Africa
yellow-throated longclaw
Taxa named by Louis Jean Pierre Vieillot
Taxonomy articles created by Polbot